Nicholas Opiyo is a Ugandan human rights lawyer and campaigner for civil rights and political freedoms. He is the executive director of Chapter Four Uganda.

Background and Education 
Opiyo grew up in Gulu northern Uganda at the height of the conflict between the government of Uganda and the Lord's resistance army of Joseph Kony. Many of his friends and family members including his sister were abducted by the rebels to serve as slaves, soldiers and labourers. His sister spent 8 years in the hands of the rebels before she escaped.

Opiyo once confessed he feared sleeping home and slept on streets because they seemed safer. All these experiences shaped his passion for defending human rights.

He studied his bachelor's of law (LLB) from Uganda Christian University in 2004 and a post graduate diploma in legal practice from Law Development Center Kampala in 2005.

Career 
Opiyo focuses his work on political and civil rights especially; electoral law,restrictions of freedom of assembly,  clampdown on freedom of speech and freedom of press.

He is also known for representing and availing legal aid to LGBT people in Uganda.

In 2013, Opiyo founded Chapter four Uganda to offer legal aid and advance civil rights in Uganda.

Opiyo was a member of the team of experts to the United Nations special rapporteur on the rights to peaceful assembly and Association until 2017.

He is also the board chairman of action aid Uganda, a member of the human rights advisory board benetech, a silicon valley human rights and tech company based in palo Alto in California and African middle eastern leadership project (AMEL),  a Washington DC based think and action group.

Awards 
In 2017, Opiyo received the German Africa prize and in 2015 had received the Voices for justice award from Human rights watch. Also in 2015, he was a recipient of the Alison Des forges Award for extraordinary activism. He also received the European Union parliament Sakharou fellows prize in 2016.

Opiyo won the 2021 Human rights Tulip prize that was started by the Dutch government in 2008 to support human rights defenders to boost visibility of their work and inspire other activists.

References 

Living people
21st-century Ugandan lawyers
Uganda Christian University alumni
Year of birth missing (living people)